Homecoming is a 2019 Indonesian drama film, written and directed by Adriyanto Dewo. The film stars Asmara Abigail, Putri Ayudya, Ibnu Jamil, and Yoga Pratama. The film tells about mudik, a tradition where migrants return to their hometown before major holidays.

The film had its world premiere at the 2019 International Film Festival and Awards Macao during the International Competition segment. The film won the Best Original Screenplay at the 40th Citra Awards, with other eight nominations, including for Best Picture, Best Actor (Jamil), Best Actress (Ayudya), Best Supporting Actor (Pratama), and Best Supporting Actress (Abigail).

Premise
Aida goes on a road trip with her husband, Firman, to travel to their hometown. During the trip, they are involved in an accident leading them to meet Santi, a rural housewife. The event changes how Aida and Firman view a marriage and also find answers to her questions in life.

Cast
Putri Ayudya as Aida
Ibnu Jamil as Firman
Asmara Abigail as Santi
Yoga Pratama as Agus
Eduwart Manalu as Sapto

Production
The idea of Homecoming was conceived by Adriyanto Dewo, after realizing that behind the euphoria of mudik, fatal accidents also happen where many people lose their family members to.

Release
Homecoming had its world premiere, competing in the International Competition segment, at the 2019 International Film Festival and Awards Macao. It was also screened at the 2020 CinemAsia Film Festival in March during the Jury Award competition. Mola TV acquired the distribution rights to the film, releasing it on 28 August 2020. Two weeks after the release date, the film garnered more than 55,000 viewers.

Accolades

References

2019 drama films
Indonesian drama films